George Cresswell Furnace, also known as the George Cresswell Furnace Stack is a historic lead furnace located near Potosi, Washington County, Missouri.  It was built about 1840, and is an open hearth furnace measuring about 100 feet square at its base and constructed of massive limestone blocks interlaced with mortar. The stack rises to a height of approximately 25 feet.

It was listed on the National Register of Historic Places in 1988.

References

Industrial buildings and structures on the National Register of Historic Places in Missouri
Industrial buildings completed in 1840
Buildings and structures in Washington County, Missouri
National Register of Historic Places in Washington County, Missouri
Lead
Smelting